Alan M. Webber (born September 18, 1948) is an American entrepreneur, author, publisher, and politician serving as the 43rd mayor of Santa Fe, New Mexico, since 2018. Webber succeeded Javier Gonzales. Considered a progressive Democrat, he supports social liberalism.

Previous to his assumption of the mayoralty, he ran unsuccessfully for Governor of New Mexico as a member of the Democratic Party during the 2014 primary elections. Webber is also known for founding the technology business magazine, Fast Company in 1995.

Early life and education

Webber's father was a camera salesman. Webber started school at DeMun School in Clayton, Missouri, and later attended Mary Institute and St. Louis Country Day School. He went on to graduate from Amherst College with a Bachelor of Arts in English. While an employee of Harvard Business School, Webber worked with faculty on Changing Alliances, a book-length study of the competitiveness of the U.S. auto industry.

Career

After graduating from Amherst, Webber moved to Portland, Oregon where he worked at a start-up political journal, The Oregon Times. Subsequently, he served in the office of then-Portland City Council member Neil Goldschmidt and continued as his administrative assistant and policy advisor when he became mayor of Portland in 1972. The years Webber spent working alongside Goldschmidt resulted in Webber identifying Goldschmidt as his dear friend and mentor.

Beginning in 1978, Webber served as editorial page editor of the alternative Oregon weekly newspaper, Willamette Week, where he received an Oregon State Newspaper Publisher’s Association Award for news and feature writing. In 1980, Webber and his family moved to Washington, D.C., when Goldschmidt was named Secretary of Transportation in the Carter administration. While working as Special Assistant to the Secretary of Transportation, Webber worked on the Chrysler Corporation bailout, the crisis in the U.S. auto industry, and overall national economic competitiveness issues.

Webber worked at the Harvard Business School in 1981 as a senior research assistant and project coordinator on the auto industry in the United States. The project culminated in a book called Changing Alliances. He went on to serve for six years as managing editor and editorial director of the Harvard Business Review, during which time the publication was twice named a finalist for National Magazine Awards.

In 1995, Webber co-founded the technology business magazine, Fast Company, where he was named Adweek's Editor of the Year in 1999. In 2000, investors sold Fast Company for $360 million, which was at the time the second highest price ever paid for a U.S. magazine.
 
Webber worked as a speechwriter and policy advisor for several governors, including Massachusetts Governor (and later Democratic Presidential candidate) Michael Dukakis. Since 2010 he has been a member of the Academic Advisory Board of the Upper Austrian Think Tank Academia Superior – Institute for Future Studies.

Politics
In October 2013, Webber declared his candidacy for the Democratic Party nomination for governor of New Mexico in the 2014 New Mexico gubernatorial election. Webber finished in second place, with 22.6% of the vote, trailing Gary King, who received 35% of the vote.

In 2018, Webber ran for mayor of Santa Fe, as the incumbent, Javier Gonzales, was not seeking reelection. In an election using ranked choice voting, Webber prevailed, defeating three members of the city council and a member of the school board. He was the first choice on 39% of ballots, but ended up with 66% of the vote after the fourth round of the runoff.

Publications
  (co-author) Changing Alliances - The Harvard Business School Project On The Auto Industry And The American Economy, 1987, 
  (co-author) Going Global, 1996, 
  Rules of Thumb: 52 Truths for Winning at Business Without Losing Your Self, 2009, paperback ed. 2010 
  The Global Detective, 2010, Kindle eBook
  (co-author) Life Reimagined: Discovering Your New Life Possibilities, 2013, 

He has also written columns and articles for The Los Angeles Times, The New York Times, U.S.A. Today, Huffington Post, The New York Times Sunday Magazine and The Washington Post. Life Reimagined was featured in Forbes as one of "The Best New Books For Your Career".

Awards and recognition
Webber received an Honorary Doctor of Humane Letters from the Boston Architectural College.

Personal life
Webber married Frances Diemoz, an architect and furniture maker, in 1977. In 2003, they moved to New Mexico. They have two children.

References

External links
“Alan Webber joins race for New Mexico governor.” Santa Fe New Mexican, October 28, 2013
campaign website
November 2013 interview {48:29} on Insight New Mexico

1948 births
Mayors of Santa Fe, New Mexico
Amherst College alumni
Businesspeople from New Mexico
Living people
New Mexico Democrats
Politicians from St. Louis